Northville is an unincorporated community in Champaign County, in the U.S. state of Ohio.

History
Northville was laid out and platted in 1832.

References

Unincorporated communities in Champaign County, Ohio
Unincorporated communities in Ohio